The Oasis class is a class of 5 Royal Caribbean International cruise ships. A third Oasis-class vessel, was delivered in 2016 built by STX France, and a fourth vessel, was completed in March 2018. As of March 2022, the fifth Oasis-class ship, Wonder of the Seas, is currently in service. A sixth ship, to be named Utopia of the Seas has also been ordered by the company. 

The first two ships in the class, Oasis of the Seas and Allure of the Seas, are slightly exceeded in size by the third ship, Harmony of the Seas, while Symphony of the Seas is the second  largest cruise ship in the world. Wonder of the Seas, which was completed in 2022, is larger than Symphony of the Seas. As of 2022, all ships of the Oasis class rank as the world's largest passenger ships.

Ship features
The Oasis-class ships surpassed the earlier  ships as the world's largest and longest passenger ships. Oasis of the Seas is also  wider, and with a gross tonnage of 225,282, is around 70,000 tones larger. Oasis-class vessels can carry over 5,400 passengers.

Public areas 
Oasis-class ships are split into a number of different themed neighborhoods. Common to all ships are Entertainment Place, Central Park, Boardwalk and Royal Promenade.

Oasis-class ships feature a split structure, with the 5-deck high "Central Park" and "Boardwalk" outdoor areas running down the middle of the ship. These areas feature tropical gardens, restaurants, shops, and a working carousel.

Technical details

To keep the ship stable without increasing the draft excessively, the designers created a wide hull.

The ship's power comes from six medium-speed, marine-diesel generating sets: three 16-cylinder Wärtsilä 16V46D common rail engines producing  each and three similar 12-cylinder Wärtsilä 12V46D engines producing  each. Propulsion is provided by three  Azipods, ABB's brand of electric azimuth thrusters. These pods, suspended under the stern, contain electric motors driving  propellers. Because they are rotatable, no rudders are needed to steer the ship. Docking is assisted by four  transverse bow thrusters.

The ship carries 18 lifeboats that hold 370 people each, for a total of 6,660 people. Inflatable life rafts provide for additional passengers and crew.

Ships

Generations 
There are informally three generations of Oasis-class ship. The first generation (2009-2010) consists of Oasis of the Seas and Allure of the Seas. The second generation (2016–18) consists of Harmony of the Seas and Symphony of the Seas. The third generation (2022–24) consists of Wonder of the Seas and Utopia of the Seas.

The second generation introduced new bars and restaurants from the first-generation Quantum class, the Ultimate Abyss dry slide, a new waterpark and an Escape Room. The H2O Zone kids pool was replaced with an upgraded kids facility called Splashaway Bay.

The third generation of ships (described as "Oasis Plus" by some media sources) are marginally bigger, with around 200 additional guests at double occupancy and 100 additional crew. The third-generation includes a refurbished pool deck with a large movie screen and an additional pool on board, though far fewer hot tubs. The adults-only pool area is now enclosed and climate-controlled. It also has a new neighborhood: the Suite Neighborhood. The ship's buffet is located on Deck 15 aft rather than Deck 16 under the funnel and is the largest buffet in RCI's fleet. Other additions include a new playground and new food and drink venues.

List

Ship construction 

Oasis of the Seas, the first vessel of the class, was ordered in February 2006 and designed under the name "Project Genesis". Her keel was laid down on 11 December 2007 by STX Europe Turku Shipyard, Finland. The name Oasis of the Seas resulted from a competition held in May 2008, and full funding for Oasis of the Seas was secured in April 2009. The ship was completed and turned over to Royal Caribbean on 28 October 2009. Two days later, she departed Finland for the United States. While exiting the Baltic Sea, the vessel passed underneath the Great Belt Fixed Link in Denmark on 31 October 2009 at 23:18 UTC. The passage under the bridge was possible due to retraction of the telescoping funnels, and an additional  was gained by the squat effect whereby vessels traveling at speed in a shallow channel will be drawn deeper into the water. Proceeding through the English Channel, Oasis of the Seas stopped briefly in the Solent so that 300 shipyard workers who were on board doing finishing work could disembark, then left on the way to her intended home port of Port Everglades in Fort Lauderdale, Florida. The ship arrived there on 13 November 2009, where tropical plants were installed prior to some introductory trips and her maiden voyage on 5 December 2009.

The keel of the second ship, Allure of the Seas, was laid on 2 December 2008 at the STX Europe Turku shipyard, Finland, during a ceremony involving Royal Caribbean and STX representatives. She was launched on 20 November 2009, with further outfitting taking place while afloat in the shipyard. Allure of the Seas was declared complete and formally delivered to Royal Caribbean on 28 October 2010. She left the Turku shipyard on 29 October 2010 at 05:45 UTC, heading directly to her home port of Port Everglades. The ship is equipped with telescoping funnels to pass under bridges such as the Storebælt Bridge, which she passed on 30 October 2010.

Royal Caribbean confirmed on 25 October 2012 that they were engaged in negotiations to build the third Oasis-class ship, which would become Harmony of the Seas. The ship was officially ordered from STX France on 27 December 2012, after failing to come to an agreement with the Government of Finland for additional financial support to build the ship at the STX Finland shipyard that built the first two ships. Steel cutting began on 23 September 2013, and the ship was delivered in May 2016. The ship has 2,744 passenger staterooms with a capacity of 6,360 passengers (5,488 double occupancy), an increase of 64 passengers over the previous ships in the class, as well as 1,197 crew cabins capable of berthing 2,100 crew. The ship features an expanded adults-only solarium area and three water slides, a first for Royal Caribbean. It cost about €1 billion (US$1.35 billion) and entered service in May 2016.

In May 2014, Royal Caribbean exercised their option for a fourth Oasis-class ship, which would become Symphony of the Seas Steel cutting began in February 2015 for the fourth ship, and the name of the ship was announced in March 2017. The ship was delivered in April 2018.

In May 2016, Royal Caribbean signed an agreement for a fifth Oasis-class ship, later named Wonder of the Seas. Steel cutting began on 24 April 2019, and the keel was laid in October of that year. The ship name was announced on 10 October 2019, and the ship is planned to enter service in the spring of 2022 as the largest ship in the world, initially offering Caribbean sailings from Ft. Lauderdale, FL before repositioning to Europe to offer Western Mediterranean sailings from Barcelona, Spain and Rome, Italy. A hull section was built at Crist at Gdansk and delivered to the yard in November 2019. She was launched on 5 September 2020.

In February 2019, Royal Caribbean Cruises Ltd. ordered a sixth Oasis-class ship. Named Utopia of the Seas (the name was announced during the steel cutting ceremony). Steel cutting held in Chantiers de l'Atlantique shipyard on 5 April 2022, and keel laying held on July 2022.

Negotiations about a seventh vessel, to be built as B35 to be delivered in 2026, were stopped in 2020 because of the coronavirus pandemic.

References

External links
 Oasis of the Seas
 Royal Caribbean

Ships built in Finland
Cruise ship classes
Royal Caribbean International
Ships built in France